Cristian David Pavón (born 21 January 1996) is an Argentine professional footballer who plays as a winger for Atlético Mineiro.

Club career

Talleres
Pavón played for Talleres de Córdoba's youth setup until 7 February 2012, when he signed his professional contract for the team. He did so at only 16 years of age.

Boca Juniors
On 9 July 2014, Pavón signed with Argentine club Boca Juniors for €3.19M.

Loan to LA Galaxy
On 8 August 2019, Pavón signed on loan with Major League Soccer side LA Galaxy for the remainder of the 2019 season, with the option to make the deal permanent. He scored his first goal for LA Galaxy on 25 August 2019 against Los Angeles FC. The Galaxy exercised the option to extend his loan for the 2020 season on 19 November 2019.

Atlético Mineiro
On 3 July 2022, Pavón joined Brazilian club Atlético Mineiro on a free transfer and a three-year contract.

International career
At international level, Pavón represented the Argentina Olympic Football Team at the 2016 Summer Olympics. In 2017, he was selected to the Argentina national team for friendlies against Russia and Nigeria. He had an impressive debut against Russia, assisting Sergio Aguero on the only goal of the game. He made another assist for Aguero to score against Nigeria in a game that ultimately ended in a 4–2 loss.

In May 2018, Pavón was named in Argentina's preliminary 35-man squad for the 2018 FIFA World Cup in Russia; later that month, he was included in Jorge Sampaoli's final 23-man squad for the competition, and was assigned the number 22 shirt.

Career statistics

Club

International
Statistics accurate as of match played 11 September 2018.

Honours
Boca Juniors
 Argentine Primera División: 2015, 2016–17, 2017–18
 Copa Argentina: 2014–15, 2019–20
 Supercopa Argentina: 2018

References

External links

1996 births
Living people
Association football forwards
Argentine footballers
Talleres de Córdoba footballers
Boca Juniors footballers
Club Atlético Colón footballers
LA Galaxy players
Clube Atlético Mineiro players
Argentine Primera División players
Primera Nacional players
Argentina international footballers
Argentina youth international footballers
Argentina under-20 international footballers
Footballers from Córdoba, Argentina
Footballers at the 2016 Summer Olympics
Olympic footballers of Argentina
2018 FIFA World Cup players
Designated Players (MLS)
Major League Soccer players
Argentine expatriate footballers
Argentine expatriate sportspeople in the United States
Argentine expatriate sportspeople in Brazil
Expatriate soccer players in the United States
Expatriate footballers in Brazil